Norwegian Civil Defence is the civil defence organization of Norway.

The Norwegian Civil Defence sorts under the Norwegian Directorate for Civil Protection and Emergency Planning which again reports to the Ministry of Justice and Public Security. The organization is based on conscription where both men and women between the age of 18 and 55 can be called to serve. The Civil Defence are to support the police, fire departments, health care or other public agencies in case of larger incidents which those departments don't have the manpower to handle.

Organization 

The Norwegian Civil Defence is split into.
 Peacetime Contingency Teams (FIG)
 Peacetime Contingency Teams - Personnel (FIG-P)
 Mobile Decontamination Units (MRE)
 Air Alert Service (LVG)
 Radiation measurement patrols (RAD)

As of 2016 the Norwegian Civil Defence has an operative force of 8,000 men and women with duty to serve. In addition, a wartime reserve force of 8000 personnel will be trained and equipped should the need arise.

Peacetime Contingency Teams (FIG) 
The most active part of the Norwegian Civil defence. Each FIG contains 22 persons, one FIG leader and a second in command. The rest of the personnel are divided in two teams led by a team leader, and a second team leader. The FIG personnel are to respond to a call-out within one hour and there are 119 active teams in the country

Peacetime Contingency Teams – Personnel (FIG-P) 
This is a release-reinforcement unit for the FIG. The personnel have exactly the same training as FIG. FIG-P have a call-out time of 30–60 minutes. Normally there is one Fig-P troop per FIG unit, divided in two teams.

Mobile Decontamination Units (MRE) 
There are 17 mobile clean-up units in the organization. Each group consists of 24 persons that are specially trained in decontamination of people that has been exposed to chemical, biological, or radioactive agents (CBRN).

The teams are equipped with a rapid deployable mobile decontamination unit that can be deployed at any site where chemical, biological or radioactive contamination had been detected.

Radiation Measurement patrols (RAD) 
This is the smallest unit in the organization and consists of four personnel trained in measuring radioactivity. The unit measures background radiation at set locations and times for comparison.
They are also trained in location radioactive materials.

There are 123 teams currently operating.

Ranks and rank insignia

History 
The Norwegian Civil Defence was first founded as the voluntary air protection in 1936. It was later renamed to the civil air protection. The primary task for the organization was to protect civilians in case of war. This is also evident in the law from 1953 that still governs the organization. Even so the organization has adapted to the change in threats against civilians.

See also 
 Civil defense by nation

References

External links 

 Norwegian Civil Defence
 The Directorate for Civil Protection and Emergency Planning (DSB)

Emergency services in Norway
Government agencies of Norway
Civil defense